David MacKeen (September 20, 1839 – November 13, 1916) was a Canadian surveyor, mine manager, politician, and the 11th Lieutenant Governor of Nova Scotia.

Life
Born in Mabou, he was elected to the House of Commons of Canada for the riding of Cape Breton in the 1887 federal election. A Conservative, he was re-elected in the 1891 election. He was summoned to the Senate of Canada in 1896, representing the senatorial division of Cape Breton, Nova Scotia. He resigned in 1915 when he was appointed Lieutenant Governor of Nova Scotia. He died in office in 1916.

Electoral record

References

External links
 
 

1839 births
1916 deaths
Canadian senators from Nova Scotia
Conservative Party of Canada (1867–1942) MPs
Lieutenant Governors of Nova Scotia
Members of the House of Commons of Canada from Nova Scotia